The Yugoslavia women's national volleyball team was the women's national volleyball team of Yugoslavia.

Results

Olympic Games

World Championship

European Championship

World Cup
1973-1991 - did not qualify

Mediterranean Games
1975 —  1st place
1979 —  2nd place
1983 —  3rd place
1987 — did not participate
1991 — did not participate

Notable squads
1951 European Championship
Štefanija Milošev, Nataša Luković, Gordana Tkačuk, Branka Popović, Desanka Končar, Danica Glumac, Liza Valentan, Anica Flis, Ančka Magušar, Tilka Završnik, coach: Branislav Marković

Notable former players
  Nataša Luković
  Štefanija Milošev
  Milica Stojadinović (1955–1971)
  Cvijeta Stakić
  Nada Gašević
  Gabrijela Hrvat - Jurkić

See also

Yugoslavia men's national volleyball team
 Bosnia and Herzegovina women's national volleyball team
 Croatia women's national volleyball team
 Serbia women's national volleyball team
 Slovenia women's national volleyball team
 Republic of Macedonia women's national volleyball team
 Montenegro women's national volleyball team

References

 

National women's volleyball teams
Vol
Women